Smithfield Township is one of the fourteen townships of Jefferson County, Ohio, United States.  The 2010 census found 3,473 people in the township, 1,819 of whom lived in the unincorporated portions of the township.

Geography
Located in the southwestern part of the county, it borders the following townships:
Wayne Township - north
Wells Township - northeast
Warren Township - southeast
Mount Pleasant Township - south
Short Creek Township, Harrison County - southwest
Green Township, Harrison County - northwest

Several populated places are located in Smithfield Township:
Part of the village of Adena, in the southwest
Part of the village of Dillonvale, in the southeast
The village of Smithfield, in the northeast
The unincorporated community of Greentown, in the east
The unincorporated community of Piney Fork, in the center

Name and history
Smithfield Township was founded in 1805. It takes its name from the village of Smithfield, which predates its establishment.

It is the only Smithfield Township statewide.

Government
The township is governed by a three-member board of trustees, who are elected in November of odd-numbered years to a four-year term beginning on the following January 1. Two are elected in the year after the presidential election and one is elected in the year before it. There is also an elected township fiscal officer, who serves a four-year term beginning on April 1 of the year after the election, which is held in November of the year before the presidential election. Vacancies in the fiscal officership or on the board of trustees are filled by the remaining trustees.

References

External links
County website

Townships in Jefferson County, Ohio
Townships in Ohio